Gymnocheta is a genus of flies in the family Tachinidae.

Species 
G. flamma Zimin, 1958
G. frontalis Brooks, 1945
G. goniata Chao, 1979
G. magna Zimin, 1958
G. mesnili Zimin, 1958
G. porphyrophora Zimin, 1958
G. ruficornis Williston, 1886
G. rufipalpis Brooks, 1945
G. viridis (Fallén, 1810)
G. vivida Williston, 1886

References 

Tachininae
Tachinidae genera
Taxa named by Jean-Baptiste Robineau-Desvoidy